Eupithecia tenerifensis is a moth in the family Geometridae. It is endemic to the Canary Islands.

The wingspan is 20–22 mm. Adults are on wing year round.

The larvae feed on herbaceous plants, including Rumex lunaria and Rumex maderensis. Larvae can be found year-round.

References

tenerifensis
Moths of Africa
Endemic insects of the Canary Islands
Moths described in 1906
Taxa named by Hans Rebel